Heinrich Lohrer (29 June 1918 – 12 December 2011) was an ice hockey player for the Swiss national team. He won a bronze medal at the 1948 Winter Olympics. He was a brother of Werner Lohrer.

References 

1918 births
2011 deaths
Ice hockey players at the 1948 Winter Olympics
Olympic bronze medalists for Switzerland
Olympic ice hockey players of Switzerland
Olympic medalists in ice hockey
People from Plessur District
Medalists at the 1948 Winter Olympics
ZSC Lions players
Sportspeople from Graubünden